Dedication 2 is the fifth mixtape by Lil Wayne, hosted by DJ Drama. It is a sequel to Lil Wayne's previous mixtape, The Dedication, and is second in DJ Drama's Gangsta Grillz series with Lil Wayne. It is one of the few mixtapes in the hip hop genre to be both financially successful and critically acclaimed. Despite its illegal use of unlicensed instrumentals and samples, it was sold through iTunes and retail stores such as Best Buy and FYE, was widely reviewed in the mainstream media, and peaked at #69 on Billboard's "Top R&B/Hip-Hop Albums” chart. The cover shows Lil Wayne with "Fear God" tattooed on his eyelids. Much of the mixtape showcases Lil Wayne's free associating rhymes and "liquid non-sequiturs."

Critical reception 
Dedication 2 became a highly acclaimed mixtape by appearing on the year-end top ten lists from the New Yorker critic Sasha Frere-Jones, The New York Times critic Kelefa Sanneh, the Baltimore City Paper's Jason Torres, and appearing on a panel of critics at the Washington City Paper. Tom Breihan of The Village Voice proclaimed it the best summer album of 2006, praising DJ Drama's "impeccable beat selection". "SportsCenter" was complimented for its "free associating brain bursts." The track titled "Georgia... Bush" was also acclaimed for its "mesmerizing indictment" of President Bush. In 2009, Rhapsody ranked this album at number 15 on its "100 Best Albums of the Decade" list.

Track listing 
 All tracks were arranged by DJ Drama.

Charts

References

External links 
 [ Dedication 2] at Allmusic

Lil Wayne albums
DJ Drama albums
2006 mixtape albums
Albums produced by DJ Toomp
Albums produced by 9th Wonder
Albums produced by Just Blaze
Albums produced by Swizz Beatz
Albums produced by the Runners
Sequel albums